List of ships built by Aberdeen shipbuilders Hall, Russell & Company, from yard number 701 to 800.

The ships built in the sequence 701 to 800 cover the period 1929 – 1947. The yard produced a wide range of different vessels, initially continuing with trawlers for the British fishing industry before switching to naval vessels during World War II.

Notes

 Where available, vessel measurements taken from Lloyd's Register, giving registered length, beam and draft. Hall, Russell and Company's own measurements typically are length overall, beam and moulded depth.
 Yard Number 719, 720 unused, likely cancelled.
 Yard Number 739, 740 unused, likely cancelled.
 Yard Number 777, 778 unused, likely cancelled.
 Yard Number 780 unused, likely cancelled.
 Yard Number 790 unused, likely cancelled.
 Yard Number 792 unused, likely cancelled.
 Yard Number 798 unused, likely cancelled.

References

Bibliography

Ships built in Scotland